Vaid is a surname of Indian origin. It is found among several communities, including Oswals, Mohyals, and Parsis. Vaid or Ved is a sanskrit word used for practitioner (Vaidya) of Ayurveda medicine.

Notable people with the surname include:

Sahil Vaid (born 1986), Indian actor
Aryan Vaid (born 1971), Indian model
Bakshi Tirath Ram Vaid (1857–1924), British Indian Army officer
Dawood Vaid, Indian educator
Jyotsna Vaid, Indian-American psychologist
Krishna Baldev Vaid, Hindi writer
Madan Lal Vaid, British Indian Army officer
Marcel Vaid, Indo-Swiss film composer
Nakul Vaid, Indian film actor
Shesh Paul Vaid (born 1959), Indian police officer
Urvashi Vaid (1958-2022), [Indian-American activist and writer
Bakshi Anand Prakash Vaid (1930-2002), Indian poet and lyricist

References

Indian surnames
Hindu surnames
Mohyal clans
Punjabi tribes
Punjabi-language surnames